Richard Darryl Zanuck (December 13, 1934 – July 13, 2012) was an American film producer. His 1989 film Driving Miss Daisy won the Academy Award for Best Picture. Zanuck was also instrumental in launching the career of director Steven Spielberg, who described Zanuck as a "director's producer" and "one of the most honorable and loyal men of our profession."

Early life and career
Richard Darryl Zanuck was born in Los Angeles to actress Virginia Fox and Darryl F. Zanuck, then head of production for 20th Century Fox. He was the youngest of three children. He had two elder sisters, Darrylin (1931–2015) and Susan (1933–1980). While studying at Stanford University, he began his career in the film industry working for the 20th Century Fox story department. In 1959, Zanuck had his first shot at producing with the film Compulsion. In the 1960s, Zanuck became the president of 20th Century Fox. One year of his tenure was chronicled by John Gregory Dunne in The Studio. After failures like 1967's Doctor Dolittle, he was dismissed by his father and joined Warner Bros. as Executive Vice President.

In 1972, Zanuck joined with David Brown to form an independent production company called the Zanuck/Brown Company at Universal Pictures. Their first big hit was "The Sting" (1973) which won the Best Picture Academy Award in 1974. The two men produced a pair of Steven Spielberg's early films, The Sugarland Express (1974) and Jaws (1975). They subsequently produced such box office hits as Cocoon (1985) and Driving Miss Daisy (1989) before dissolving their partnership in 1988. They were jointly awarded the Irving G. Thalberg Memorial Award by the Academy of Motion Picture Arts and Sciences in 1990. He worked with Tim Burton six times, producing Burton's adaptation of Planet of the Apes (2001), Big Fish (2003), Charlie and the Chocolate Factory (2005), Sweeney Todd: The Demon Barber of Fleet Street (2007), Alice in Wonderland (2010), and Dark Shadows (2012). He and Burton connected immediately, and Zanuck was Burton's producer of choice. In a May 2012 interview, Zanuck told Variety: "A producer should contribute from the very beginning until the very end, in all aspects. I'm there at the set every day, on every shot. Not that the director, particularly Tim [Burton], needs me, but just in case."

Personal life
Zanuck married three times. On January 14, 1958, he married Lili Charlene Gentle (b. March 4, 1940), an actress from Birmingham, Alabama, and a second cousin of actress Tallulah Bankhead. The marriage, which produced two daughters, Virginia Lorraine Zanuck (born 1959) and Janet Beverly Zanuck (born 1960), was dissolved in 1968. 

On October 26, 1969, Zanuck and his protégé, actress Linda Harrison, together with his friend, producer Sy Bartlett, and Harrison's sister Kay, flew to Las Vegas, where Zanuck married Harrison on a balcony of the Sands Hotel. The marriage became difficult after Harrison failed to garner the role of the wife in Zanuck's production of Jaws. 

In mid-1977, as a result of his second wife's entanglement with a 65-year-old "guru", Vincentii Turriziani of the Risen Christ Foundation, and the alleged guru's claims and demands for money from Zanuck, he filed for divorce and was awarded custody of his two sons, Harrison Richard Zanuck (born 1971) and Dean Francis Zanuck (born 1972). 

In a 1985 interview, Zanuck said that career problems contributed to his two failed marriages. "Both girls were actresses, and neither one was well established," he said. As head of 20th Century Fox, "It was tough to try to be fair to the project and also try to help them in their careers. If I didn't give them the role, then I had to explain why they weren't right for it. It wasn't the major problem in the marriages, but it was an underlying source of discomfort."

On September 23, 1978, Zanuck married his third wife, Lili Fini (born 1954), a former World Bank employee and Carnation Co. office manager, who helped him raise his sons from his second marriage, and would co-produce some of his most memorable films, including Cocoon (1985), Driving Miss Daisy (1989), and Reign of Fire (2002). When the Zanucks won the Best Picture Oscar in 1989 for Driving Miss Daisy, Lili Fini Zanuck was only the second woman in history to have earned an Oscar for Best Picture. In 1998, she directed an episode of the HBO miniseries From the Earth to the Moon, titled "We Have Cleared the Tower", and in 2000, Richard and Lili Fini Zanuck co-produced the 72nd Academy Awards ceremony.

Death
Zanuck died on July 13, 2012, of a heart attack at his home in Los Angeles. The Beverly Park home he had lived in until his death was sold for $20.1M in July 2012. On February 25, 2014, 20th Century Fox opened the Richard D. Zanuck Production Building at its Los Angeles studios. "Richard was a true giant of our industry for over five decades", Fox chairman and CEO Jim Gianopulos said at the dedication ceremony. "He was family, and an integral part of our legacy. We couldn't find a building worthy of him, so we built one." The ceremony was attended by Zanuck's widow, Lili Fini Zanuck, his sons, and four of his nine grandchildren.

Filmography
He was a producer in all films unless otherwise noted.

Film

Credited as producer 

 Compulsion (1959)
 Sanctuary (1961)
 The Chapman Report (1962)
 Willie Dynamite (1974)
 The Sugarland Express (1974)
 The Girl from Petrovka (1974)
 Jaws (1975)
 Jaws 2 (1978)
 The Island (1980)
 Neighbors (1981)
 The Verdict (1982)
 Cocoon (1985)
 Target (1985)
 Cocoon: The Return (1988)
 Driving Miss Daisy (1989)
 Rush (1991)
 Rich in Love (1992)
 Clean Slate (1994)
 Wild Bill (1995)
 Mulholland Falls (1996)
 Deep Impact (1998)
 True Crime (1999)
 Rules of Engagement (2000)
 Planet of the Apes (2001)
 Road to Perdition (2002)
 Reign of Fire (2002)
 Big Fish (2003)
 Charlie and the Chocolate Factory (2005)
 Sweeney Todd: The Demon Barber of Fleet Street (2007)
 Yes Man (2008)
 Alice in Wonderland (2010)
 Dark Shadows (2012) (final film)
 Hidden (2015) (posthumous, uncredited)

Credited as executive producer 

 The Sound of Music (1965) (uncredited)
 Butch Cassidy and the Sundance Kid (1969) (uncredited)
 Sssssss (1973)
 The Sting (1973) (uncredited)
 The Black Windmill (1974)
 The Eiger Sanction (1975)
 MacArthur (1977)
 Chain Reaction (1996)
 Clash of the Titans (2010)

Other film credits

Television

Awards and nominations

References

External links

 The Zanucks: Reel Royalty

1934 births
2012 deaths
Businesspeople from Los Angeles
People from Beverly Hills, California
Stanford University alumni
Film producers from California
American film studio executives
20th Century Studios people
Warner Bros. people
Primetime Emmy Award winners
Producers who won the Best Picture Academy Award
Golden Globe Award-winning producers